Jehu is the tenth king of the northern Kingdom of Israel, according to the Bible.

For a list of other people named Jehu, see Jehu (given name)

Jehu may also refer to:
 Book of Jehu, a lost Jewish text possibly written by Jehu (prophet)
 Steve Jehu (born 1987), English gymnast
 Jehu Mountain, New York, United States
 Jehu-class landing craft, used by the Finnish Navy

See also
 Jahu (disambiguation)
 Juhu